Conus dispar is a species of sea snail, a marine gastropod mollusk in the family Conidae, the cone snails and their allies.

Like all species within the genus Conus, these snails are predatory and venomous. They are capable of "stinging" humans, therefore live ones should be handled carefully or not at all.

Description
The size of the shell varies between 15 mm and 34 mm. The color of the shell is white or yellowish white, with chestnut-chocolate maculations and spots, variously arranged in revolving series. Sometimes the ground-color of the shell is chestnut, with dark chocolate markings and chocolate aperture. The spire is somewhat concavely elevated, with an acute apex. The epidermis is thin, smooth and translucent.

Distribution
This marine species occurs in the Gulf of California, Mexico and in the Pacific Ocean down to Panama

References

 Petit, R. E. (2009). George Brettingham Sowerby, I, II & III: their conchological publications and molluscan taxa. Zootaxa. 2189: 1–218
  Puillandre N., Duda T.F., Meyer C., Olivera B.M. & Bouchet P. (2015). One, four or 100 genera? A new classification of the cone snails. Journal of Molluscan Studies. 81: 1–23

External links
 The Conus Biodiversity website
 

dispar
Gastropods described in 1833
Taxa named by George Brettingham Sowerby I